"I Wanna Be Loved" (from the 1933 version of the 1931 revue Billy Rose's Crazy Quilt) is a popular song with music by Johnny Green and lyrics by Edward Heyman and Billy Rose, published in 1933.

Recorded versions
The song is a standard, with many recorded versions:
Billy Eckstine - Passing Strangers 
The song was included in the 1934 Vitaphone short "Mirrors" featuring Fred Rich and his Orchestra. It was sung by Vera Van in a scene where she dresses in an evening gown.
The song was included in the 1934 Vitaphone Broadway Brevities short feature "The Song of Fame" sung by Ruth Etting in a nightclub scene.
The song was recorded by The Andrews Sisters in 1950. Their version became a #1 hit in the U.S, and was the trio's final #1 hit.
The song was recorded by Russell Garcia (on his 1958 album The Johnny Ever Greens), starring Sue Allen on vocal.
I Wanna Be Loved was the title track of an album by Dinah Washington with Quincy Jones and His Orchestra in 1962. 
Grant Green plays on the song on his 1963 album Am I Blue.
George Maharis covered the song on his 1963 album Just Turn Me Loose!.
Dean and Jean recorded the song in 1964 (U.S. #91).
Mina covered the song on her 1969 album Mina for You.
 Jex Saarelaht and Kate Ceberano recorded it on their album Open the Door - Live at Mietta's (1992).
Maria Muldaur performs the song on her 1999 album Meet Me Where They Play the Blues.
In 2009 Mark Isham & Kate Ceberano recorded a version for their Bittersweet album.
Kirby Lauryen performs a cover in the background of the club scene in Season 2, Episode 2 "A View in the Dark" of Marvel's Agent Carter.
Elaine Dame covered this on her You're My Thrill album (2014)

References

Songs with music by Johnny Green
Songs with lyrics by Edward Heyman
Songs with lyrics by Billy Rose
Nancy Wilson (jazz singer) songs
1933 songs